Papurana is a genus of frogs in the family Ranidae, "true frogs". They are known from Southeast Asia, New Guinea, and northern Australia. Papurana daemeli is the only ranid frog found in Australia.

Taxonomy
Papurana was originally introduced as a subgenus of Rana. It was often included in the then-diverse genus Hylarana, until Oliver and colleagues revised the genus in 2015, delimiting Hylarana more narrowly and elevating Papurana to genus rank.

Description
The unique combination of characters that can diagnose Papurana is presence of a postocular eye mask, robust body shape, posterior of thighs having strong vermiculations, and dorsolateral folds being either absent or thin, with asperities. The dorsum is evenly shagreened to warty and may carry spicules. The body size is from medium to very large. Males have paired, external vocal sac.

Species
The following species are recognised in the genus Papurana:

References

 
True frogs
Amphibian genera
Amphibians of Oceania